Connor Beauchamp (birth 20 June 1997) is a South African field hockey and cricket player who plays as the South African national team.

International career
He competed in the 2021–22 Men's FIH Pro League Shortly after this announcement, he was also named in the squad for the Commonwealth Games in Birmingham.

Personal life
Beauchamp attended St Stithians College, studied at the Stellenbosch University

References

External links

1997 births
Living people
South African male field hockey players
South African cricketers
Place of birth missing (living people)
Alumni of St Stithians College
Stellenbosch University alumni
Field hockey players at the 2022 Commonwealth Games
Field hockey players from Cape Town
21st-century South African people
2023 Men's FIH Hockey World Cup players